Isbrueckerichthys calvus is a species of armored catfish endemic to Brazil where it occurs in the Tibagi River basin.  This species grows to a length of  SL.

References 
 

Loricariidae
Catfish of South America
Freshwater fish of Brazil
Endemic fauna of Brazil
Fish described in 2006